is a 1999 Japanese animated fantasy adventure short film based on a manga series of the same name written and illustrated by Kazuki Takahashi. The short film is directed by Junji Shimizu, written by Yasuko Kobayashi, and produced by Toei Animation. The short film was released in Japan on March 6, 1999, as part of Toei Animation Spring 1999 Animation Fair, featuring alongside Dr. Slump: Arale's Surprise Burn and Digimon Adventure.

Taking place in the same continuity of the first anime series, the short revolves around a boy named Shōgo Aoyama, who is targeted by Seto Kaiba after obtaining a powerful rare card; the legendary Red-Eyes Black Dragon.

Plot
A shy boy named Shōgo Aoyama gets the rare card, Red Eyes Black Dragon, a card that brings potential to those who duel with courage. Despite having never won a game of Duel Monsters before, Shōgo boasts that he doesn't need to duel others since he'd just win with that card. Having noticed Shogo possessing this card, Seto Kaiba sends out invitations to him, as well as Yugi Muto, for a tournament against him. When Shōgo refuses the invitation, Kaiba sends one of his men to force him to attend, which catches the attention of Yugi and his friend, Katsuya Jonouchi. As Jonouchi holds off the man, Yugi and Shōgo try to escape but are attacked by another guard who steals Shōgo's Red Eyes Black Dragon and Yugi's Millennium Puzzle. As Jonouchi manages to retrieve the card, Shogo admits he didn't want to duel in case he lost with the card, so Yugi decides to duel in his place. 

Yugi retrieves his Millennium Puzzle from Kaiba and transforms into his alter ego, as Kaiba prepares his duel using a new holographic Duel Disk system. Yugi soon runs into trouble when Kaiba brings out his Blue Eyes White Dragon, and when Yugi manages to beat one, he brings out another one and combines it with his other two dragons. As Yugi moves onto the defensive, it is revealed Jonouchi had sneaked Shōgo's Red Eyes Black Dragon into Yugi's deck, though Yugi refuses to use it until Shōgo's shows courage. When Kaiba stops Yugi's ability to defend, Shōgo finally shows courage, encouraging Yugi to summon Red Eyes Black Dragon and fuses it with his Meteor Dragon to defeat Kaiba. Afterwards, things go back to normal and Shōgo starts dueling normally and making friends.

Voice cast

Megumi Ogata as Yugi Muto
Hikaru Midorikawa as Seto Kaiba
Toshiyuki Morikawa as Katsuya Jonouchi
Yumi Kakazu as Anzu Mazaki
Ryōtarō Okiayu as Hiroto Honda
Eiko Yamada as Shōgo Aoyama
Hisako Kyōda as Shopkeeper

Production
The short film is directed by Junji Shimizu, while written by Yasuko Kobayashi, who've written few episodes for the series. Michi Himeno and Shingo Araki returned from the television series to design the characters and animation direction, along with BMF providing the music for the film.

Release
The short film was released in theaters in Japan on March 6, 1999, as part of Toei Animation Spring 1999 Animation Fair, and was featured alongside with Dr. Slump: Arale's Surprise Burn and Digimon Adventure.

Reception

Box office
The short film, along with Dr. Slump: Arale's Surprise Burn and Digimon Adventure collectively grossed .

References

External links

1990s Japanese films
1999 anime films
Toei Animation films
Animated films based on manga
Japanese short films